Hengky Pie (born 4 September 1966) is an Indonesian former judoka. He competed in the men's half-heavyweight event at the 1992 Summer Olympics.

References

External links
 

1966 births
Living people
Indonesian male judoka
Olympic judoka of Indonesia
Judoka at the 1992 Summer Olympics
Place of birth missing (living people)
20th-century Indonesian people
21st-century Indonesian people